The C&C 57 is a Canadian sailboat. The design was built by C&C Yachts in Canada, but it is now out of production.

Production
At least three examples were produced (based on Hull Identification Numbers (HIN) in the US Coast Guard database), the first, named Terica II, and the second, named "Showtime", both launched in 1988, with hull number 3, La Isla, completed in 1989.

Design
The C&C 57 is a recreational keelboat, built predominantly of fibreglass. It has a masthead sloop rig, a raked stem, a raised reverse transom with built-in steps and swimming platform, and a centre cockpit. It displaces  and carries  of ballast.

Hull
One inch balsa core fiberglass sandwich construction consisting of triaxial fiberglass. Centerline structure is stiffened with a build-up of unidirectional roving. The exterior has a highly polished gelcoat finish. Additional unidirectional fab mat is employed in areas of high stress such as between the chainplates and the mast step. All interior bulkheads are structural members of marine grade plywood. They are fully bonded with fiberglass where adjoining the hull. This provides great structural integrity in the combined hull/deck interior structure, ensuring that the interior structure performs the dual function of providing accommodation and hull/deck stiffening.

Deck
Balsa core fiberglass sandwich construction similar to the hull using layers of unidirectional fabric. The balsa is replaced with high density core in the areas of major deck fittings. The deck is solidly bonded to the hull with fiberglass overlays, marine sealant and mechanical fastenings of stainless steel bolts in conjunction with the C&C toe rail.

Keel and rudder
The fixed fin keel carries ballast consisting of a lead casting alloyed with antimony for increased strength, bolted through the hull with stainless steel bolts through the reinforced fiberglass floors to spread the load over the hull.

The internally-mounted  cantilevered balanced spade-type rudder is moulded of fiberglass and cored with foam. A stainless steel rudder post with welded stiffeners for the blade, passes through large diameter bearings which are strongly bonded to the hull. Steering is by a  wheel.

Accommodations
The boat was described as the most luxurious yacht in the C&C line in 1989.

Main saloon
The centre-cockpit companionway opens below into the main saloon with a large dining area which can seat ten people and also includes an entertainment centre, navigation station, additional occasional seating, and a 'day' head (powder room).

Galley
The galley includes a four-burner stove top, oven, microwave oven, molded one-piece sinks, teak cupboards, Avonite counters, a front opening refrigerator and ample storage.

Staterooms
In addition to the separate crew quarters opening off the main saloon there is an owner's stateroom aft with a queen-sized bed, vanity dresser, and full four-piece private head. There are also two separate staterooms forward for guests, each with private heads and shower stalls.

Systems

Engine

Fuel
Fuel tanks are custom fabricated of aluminum with  capacity each (total of ) with proper bafflings, fills, vents and outlets. All fuel lines are of quality hose with fuel filters, connected such that each fuel tank may be used separately.

Water
Water is stored in F.D.A. approved tanks holding  with on-deck fills. Two  hot water tanks will supply the required hot water.

Optional equipment
Optional equipment included air conditioning, an ice making machine and a bow thruster for maneuvering.

See also

 List of sailing boat types

References

External links
 Original C&C 57 brochure

Keelboats
1980s sailboat type designs
Sailing yachts
Sailboat types built by C&C Yachts